Saselbek is a short, little river of Hamburg, Germany. It flows into the Alster near Hamburg-Bergstedt.

See also
List of rivers of Hamburg

Rivers of Hamburg
Rivers of Germany